Lowell Junior/Senior High School is a public junior/senior high school in Lowell, Oregon, United States. It serves grades 7-12.

Academics
In 2017, 88% of the school's seniors received a high school diploma.<ref>Oregon Department of Education school report cards

References

High schools in Lane County, Oregon
Public middle schools in Oregon
Public high schools in Oregon